Morgan Wood (born Southern Saskatchewan) is a curator and artist who is Stony Mountain Cree. Her family is from the Michel Callihou Band in Alberta and her Great Grandmother was Victoria Callihou. Wood received a Bachelor of Indian Art from the First Nations University of Canada, at the University of Regina in Regina, Saskatchewan.

In 2003 Wood participated in the Aboriginal Curatorial Residency at the Mendel Art Gallery in Saskatoon, Saskatchewan. It was during that time she wrote "Wildfire on the Plains: Contemporary Saskatchewan Art."

She was a member of the Saskatchewan Aboriginal Museum Advisory Board for the Saskatchewan Museum Association.

Work 
Here and Now was an exhibition at the Dunlop Art Gallery, in Regina, Saskatchewan in 1999 that brought together contemporary Aboriginal art work from the Southern half of Saskatchewan. Wood created Exxxposed: Aesthetics of Aboriginal Erotic Art, with the MacKenzie Art Gallery, Regina, SK, 1999. 

Her art piece Hands Off My Genes (1997) was on display at the MacKenzie Art Gallery. It is a sculpture made of a pair of found blue jeans in the surrealist and dadaist style. The jeans been left open to resemble a woman's legs and abdomen, equipped with protruding porcupine quills in white and blue. Wood referenced porcupine quills in another work titled Love & Sex (1995).

Her work was included in an exhibit curated by Leah Taylor titled Towards Action at the Kenderdine Art Gallery in 2017 alongside the works of Allyson Clay, Marcel Dzama, Angela Grossmann, Istvan Kantor, Alastair Mackie, Jane Ash Poitras, and John Scott.

Writing 
"Daphne Odjig." In Daphne Odjig: four decades of prints. (2005). Pages 9 – 22. .

Wild fire on the plains : contemporary Saskatchewan art : Anthony Deiter, David Garneau, Cheryl L'hirondelle-Waynohtêw, Neal McLeod.

Shaping the Future of Aboriginal Curatoral Practice. Lee-Ann Martin, Morgan Wood, Inuit Art Quarterly, Vol. 13, No. 2, Summer, 1998, pp. 22–25. Publication Date: 1998

References

Year of birth missing (living people)
Living people
Artists from Saskatchewan
Canadian women artists
University of Regina alumni